Rugby union in Belgium is a growing sport. The national governing body for rugby union in Belgium is the Belgian Rugby Federation. The national team plays in the European Nations Cup, and as of October 2014, they were ranked thirtieth in the World Rugby Rankings.

Governing body
The national governing body for rugby union in Belgium is the Belgian Rugby Federation (FBRB - Fédération Belge de Rugby in French and Belgische Rugby Bond in Dutch) which is headquartered in Brussels. The Belgian Rugby Federation was formed in 1931, and joined the IRFB in 1988.

Rugby union is governed by two regional bodies that answer to FBRB, the national governing body.  Most of the clubs in the northern region of Belgium are governed by the Vlaamse Rugby Bond (VRB).  The remaining clubs are governed by the Ligue Belge Francophone de Rugby (LBFR).

Rugby union in Belgium is also structured into four districts for competition purposes.  These districts are; Brabant, Hainaut, Liège/Namur/Luxembourg, and Flanders.

Within these districts, there are also several leagues and divisions that are structured based on the skill level of the clubs.

History
For a long time, Belgian rugby's most high-profile personality was the former international referee, Teddy Lacroix, who became president of the union.

Rugby union in Belgium has not been popular historically, but due to its recent international successes, it is a quickly growing sport.  As of the December 2007, more than half of the nearly seven thousand registered players are pre-teens or teenagers.  In addition, there are currently forty-eight domestic clubs that compete against each other on various levels.

Notable players
Notable Belgian rugby players include:

 Jacques Rogge, best known as the eighth president of the International Olympic Committee (IOC), played on the Belgium national rugby team.
 John Raphael, born and died in Belgium, but moved to England as a child and was educated there. He was  capped nine times for England in 1905 and 1906.  In 1910 he captained the British Lions in a tour of Argentina, consisting of the South American nation's inaugural Test match.
 James Atkins
 Oli Hockley	
 Jimmy Parker
 Vincent Debaty

National team

The national team, nicknamed the Black Devils, has been competing in international tests since 1932.

2006-08 European Nations Cup
The national team competed in competition in the Second Division at the 2010-2012 European Nations Cup winning the division and securing promotion to Division 1A for the next season.

¹ Results from Belgian view

See also

Belgian Rugby Federation
Belgium national rugby union team
Belgium national rugby sevens team
Belgium women's national rugby union team
Belgian Elite League

References
 Richards, Huw A Game for Hooligans: The History of Rugby Union (Mainstream Publishing, Edinburgh, 2007)

External links
Official website of the Fédération Belge de Rugby (in Dutch)
Official website of the Belgian Rugby Federation (in English)
Official website of the Vlaamse Rugby Bond (in Dutch)
Official website of the Ligue Belge Francophone  (in Dutch)
 Archives du Rugby: Belgique